The 2017 Euronics European Masters was held from April 19–22 at the Sports Center Lerchenfeld in St. Gallen, Switzerland. It was the final event on the Curling Champions Tour (CCT) of Europe, and featured the top teams from the CCT rankings.

Men

Teams
The teams are listed as follows:

Round robin standings
Final Round Robin Standings

Playoffs

Women

Teams
The teams are listed as follows:

Round robin standings

Playoffs

References

External links

2017
2017 in Swiss sport
2017 in curling
Sport in St. Gallen (city)
April 2017 sports events in Europe
Curling competitions in Switzerland